Alexander Garvin (March 8, 1941 – December 17, 2021) was an American urban planner, educator, and author. At the time of his death, he was in private practice at AGA Public Realm Strategists in New York City and was also an adjunct professor at the Yale School of Architecture, where he taught from 1967 on. He is widely known for having created the vision plan of Atlanta's proposed greenbelt park system, the Atlanta BeltLine, serving as planning director for New York City's 2012 Olympic Games bid, and overseeing efforts to redevelop lower Manhattan after the September 11th attacks as Vice President of Planning, Design, and Development for the Lower Manhattan Development Corporation. Garvin also authored a number of books on the subject of planning including The Planning Game: Lessons from Great Cities and The American City: What Works, What Doesn't. Garvin also served in a variety of positions in New York City government including director of comprehensive planning.

Professional career

Early career and New York City government
Following his graduation from the Yale School of Architecture, Garvin began his career working as an architect at a number of firms including the firm of Philip Johnson and John Burgee. Soon after in 1970, however, he moved into public service, serving first as director of housing and community development for New York City's Department of City Planning (DCP), then as deputy commissioner of the city's Housing & Development Administration department (HDA). At DCP, he arranged financing for projects such as the West Village Houses and was instrumental in the development of the neighborhood preservation program; while at HDA he was responsible for initiating the Participation Loan Program, and, most notably, for extending the J-51 Tax Exemption and Abatement Program to apply to the city's entire stock of multiple dwellings. Later during the Koch administration, he served as the city's director of comprehensive planning. Garvin also spent fifteen years as a private developer of residential real estate between 1980 and 1995. In 1996, Garvin published The American City: What Works, What Doesn’t, his most significant book. Now in its third edition, The American City has become a popular textbook among students of urban planning.

NYC2012 and LMDC
After reading The American City in 1996, Daniel Doctoroff hired Garvin as managing director of planning and design for NYC2012, New York City's bid for the 2012 Summer Olympics. Garvin's plan for the games became known as the “Olympic X,” which consisted of two axes—a north-south axis along the East River and an east-west axis along the Long Island Rail Road—which would have come together in Long Island City, the site of the Olympic Village.   The plan would have provided an impetus for the redevelopment of western Queens, revamped the city's transportation infrastructure, and created new housing, public spaces, and sports facilities in Manhattan, Brooklyn, Queens, Staten Island, and the Bronx.  While International Olympic Committee ultimately rejected New York City's bid for the games in favor of London's, planners continue to draw inspiration from Garvin's plan as they pursue initiatives such as the Hudson Yards Redevelopment Project at the site of the proposed “Olympic Square,” the 7 Subway Extension, and parks along the East River in Brooklyn and Queens such as Brooklyn Bridge Park.

When Doctoroff became deputy mayor for economic development during the Bloomberg Administration, Garvin joined the Lower Manhattan Development Corporation (LMDC), which was responsible for planning the rebuilding of Lower Manhattan, including the World Trade Center site, following the September 11th Attacks. There, he served as vice-president of planning, design, and development until May 2003.

The Atlanta Beltline
Following his work at the LMDC, Garvin founded AGA Public Realm Strategists (formerly known as Alex Garvin and Associates), a strategic consulting firm “that specializes in the development of the public realm—a city’s streets and squares, sidewalks and buildings, waterfront and parks.”

In 2004, the firm was hired by the Trust for Public Land to prepare a study of the state of public space, recreation, transportation, and economic development along the fringes of Atlanta, Georgia. The result of the study was the master plan for the Atlanta BeltLine, a network of green spaces and parks along a loop of rights-of-way of freight railroad corridors that encircle Atlanta.  The 22-mile loop would connect the city's 46 neighborhoods and 13 new and renovated “jewels” (public parks, squares, and plazas).  The Beltline would begin as a public greenway and paved trail for jogging, cycling, and walking and later incorporate a light rail transit system, supported by increased tax revenue from private development spurred by the trail.  In 2005, the BeltLine Partnership (later Atlanta BeltLine, Inc.) was formed to administer the project. The first portions of the BeltLine opened to the public in 2008.

Other activities
As part of his private practice, Garvin created a number of master plans including those of Hinton Park, Tennessee; DeKalb County, Georgia; and Tessera, a planned community on Lake Travis outside Austin, Texas; among others.  He also served on the boards of directors for several professional organizations including the Forum for Urban Design, the Ed Bacon Foundation, the Trust for Public Land, and the Society for American City and Regional Planning History. From 1996 to 2004, he was also a national fellow at the Urban Land Institute. In addition, he administered architectural design competitions for a number of prominent projects including the rebuilt World Trade Center, the 2012 NYC Olympic Village, the Domino Sugar Refinery in Williamsburg, Brooklyn, and Shelby Farms Park in Tennessee.

Personal life
Garvin was born in New York City on March 8, 1941, to Jacques and Margarita (Volpe) Garvin. His parents were born in Russia. In 1962, he received a Bachelor of Arts degree in Architecture from Yale College and later both a Masters in Architecture and a Masters in Urban Studies from the Yale School of Architecture in 1967. Garvin was a member of the Yale Russian Chorus in its early years, contributing substantially during trips to Russia in the late 1950s because of drawing skills, and his knowledge of and enthusiasm for American abstract art.  He resided in New York City on Manhattan's Upper East Side, where he lived for most of his life. 

Garvin died on December 17, 2021, at the age of 80.

References

Further reading
Garvin, Alexander. The American City: What Works, What Doesn’t 
Garvin, Alexander. The Planning Game: Lessons for Great Cities (W.W. Norton 2013)
Garvin, Alexander. Public Parks: The Key to Livable Communities (W.W. Norton 2011)
Garvin, Alexander. Parks, Recreation, and Open Space: A 21st Century Agenda 
Garvin, Alexander. The Beltline Emerald Necklace: Atlanta’s New Public Realm, commissioned by the Georgia office of The Trust for Public Land.

External links
AGA Public Realm Strategists
Yale School of Architecture - Faculty Profile
History of Atlanta's Beltline
Olympic X Video

1941 births
2021 deaths
American urban planners
Yale School of Architecture faculty
Architects from New York (state)
Yale School of Architecture alumni
People from the Upper East Side
Yale College alumni